Garnish GAA is a Gaelic Athletic Association club located in Allihies, County Cork, Ireland. The club, situated in the heart of the Beara Peninsula is exclusively concerned with the game of Gaelic football. The club plays in the Beara division of Cork GAA.

Honours

 Beara Junior Football Championship (17): 1928, 1932, 1940, 1948, 1951, 1952, 1953, 1978, 1979, 1995, 1996, 1997, 2003, 2013, 2014, 2016, 2017, 2018

External links
Garnish GAA site

Gaelic games clubs in County Cork
Gaelic football clubs in County Cork